Dvorišće is a village in Croatia. Between 1931 and 1991, it was known as Dvorište.

Religion

Roman Catholic Chapel of the Saint Anthony of Padua
Roman Catholic chapel of the Saint Anthony of Padua in Dvorišće was constructed in 1743 at the site of an earlier chapel from 1668. The building was significantly altered in the 19th century. During the Croatian War of Independence it was devastated by the Yugoslav People's Army and the Republic of Serbian Krajina forces. The reconstruction process was completed after the end of war.

References

External links

Populated places in Sisak-Moslavina County
Glina, Croatia